Porotaka is a genus of South Pacific funnel weavers first described by Raymond Robert Forster & C. L. Wilton in 1973.  it contains only two species.

References

External links

Agelenidae
Araneomorphae genera
Spiders of New Zealand
Taxa named by Raymond Robert Forster